Ponomarenko is a Ukrainian-language patronymic surname derived from the nickname ponomar, meaning "church bell ringer" (as related to the duties of a sexton).  The surname is common in Ukraine, Russia, and Belarus. 

The surname Ponomarenko may refer to the following people:

 Alexander Ponomarenko (born 1964), Russian billionaire businessman
 Anthony Ponomarenko (born 2001), American ice dancer
 Dmytro Ponomarenko (born 1991), Ukrainian track cyclist
 Illia Ponomarenko, Defense and security reporter at the Kyiv Independent
 Ivan Ponomarenko (born 1998), Ukrainian footballer
 Larysa Ponomarenko, Ukrainian Paralympic volleyball player
 Mikhail Ponomarenko (born 1999), Russian footballer
 Panteleimon Ponomarenko (19021984), Soviet-Ukrainian administrator
 Sergei Ponomarenko (born 1960), Russian ice dancer
 Sergei Yuryevich Ponomarenko (born 1987), Russian footballer
 Serhiy Ponomarenko (born 1983), Ukrainian footballer
 Špela Ponomarenko Janić (born 1981), Slovenian canoer
 Vitaliy Mykolayovych Ponomarenko (born 1969), Ukrainian footballer
 Vitaliy Ponomarenko (19742008), Ukrainian powerlifter
 Volodymyr Ponomarenko (born 1972), Ukrainian footballer

See also 

 
 Ponomar
 Ponomarchuk
 Ponomarev

Patronymic surnames
Surnames of Ukrainian origin
Ukrainian-language surnames